Antibody (or immunoglobulin) structure is made up of two heavy-chains and two light-chains. These chains are held together by disulfide bonds. The arrangement or processes that put together different parts of this antibody molecule play important role in antibody diversity and production of different subclasses or classes of antibodies. The organization and processes take place during the development and differentiation of B cells. That is, the controlled gene expression during transcription and translation coupled with the rearrangements of immunoglobulin gene segments result in the generation of antibody repertoire during development and maturation of B cells.

B-Cell development 
 
During the development of B cells, the immunoglobulin gene undergoes sequences of rearrangements that lead to formation of the antibody repertoire. For example, in the lymphoid cell, a partial rearrangement of the heavy-chain gene occurs which is followed by complete rearrangement of heavy-chain gene. Here at this stage, Pre-B cell, mμ heavy chain and surrogate light chain are formed. The final rearrangement of the light chain gene generates immature B cell and mIgM. The process explained here occurs only in the absence of the antigen. The mature B cell formed as RNA processing changes leaves the bone marrow and is stimulated by the antigen then differentiated into IgM -secreted plasma cells. Also at first, the mature B cell expresses membrane-bound IgD and IgM. These two classes could switch to secretory IgD and IgM during the processing of mRNAs.

Finally, further class switching follows as the cell keep dividing and differentiating. For instance, IgM switches to IgG which switches to IgA that eventually switches to IgE

The multigene organization of immunoglobulin genes 
     
From studies and predictions such as Dreyer and Bennett's, it shows that the light chains and heavy chains are encoded by separate multigene families on different chromosomes. They are referred to as gene segments and are separated by non-coding regions.  The rearrangement and organization of these gene segments during the maturation of B cells produce functional proteins. The entire process of rearrangement and organization of these gene segments is the vital source where our body immune system gets its capabilities to recognize and respond to variety of antigens.

Light chain multigene family 

The light chain gene has three gene segments. These include: the light chain variable region (V), joining region (J), and constant region (C) gene segments.  The variable region of light is therefore encoded by the rearrangement of VJ segments. The light chain can be either kappa,κ or lambda,λ. This process takes place at the level of mRNAs processing. Random rearrangements and recombinations of the gene segments at DNA level to form one kappa or lambda light chain occurs in an orderly fashion. As a result, "a functional variable region gene of a light chain contains two coding segments that are separated by a non-coding DNA sequence in unrearranged germ-line DNA" (Barbara et al., 2007).

Heavy-chain multigene family 

Heavy chain contains similar gene segments such as VH, JH and CH, but also has another gene segment called D (diversity).  Unlike the light chain multigene family, VDJ gene segments code for the variable region of the heavy chain. The rearrangement and reorganization of gene segments in this multigene family is more complex . The rearranging and joining of segments produced different end products because these are carried out by different RNA processes. The same reason is why the IgM and IgG are generates at the time.

Variable-region rearrangements 

The variable region rearrangements happen in an orderly sequence in the bone marrow. Usually, the assortment of these gene segments occurs at B cell maturation.

Light chain DNA 

The kappa and lambda light chains undergo rearrangements of the V and J gene segments.  In this process, a functional Vlambda can combine with four functional Jλ –Cλ combinations. On the other hands, Vk gene segments can join with either one of the Jk functional gene segments. The overall rearrangements result in a gene segment order from 5 prime to 3 prime end. These are a short leader (L) exon, a noncoding sequence (intron), a joined VJ segment, a second intron, and the constant region.  There is a promoter upstream from each leader gene segment. The leader exon is important in the transcription of light chain by the RNA polymerase. To remain with coding sequence only, the introns are removed during RNA- processing and repairing. In summary,

Heavy chain DNA 

The rearrangements of heavy-chains are different from the light chains because DNA undergoes rearrangements of V-D-J gene segments in the heavy chains. These reorganizations of gene segments produce gene sequence from 5 prime to 3 prime ends such as a short leader exon, an intron, a joined VDJ segment, a second intron and several gene segments. The final product of the rearrangement is transcribed when RNA polymerase

Mechanism of variable region rearrangements 

It is understood that rearrangement occurs between specific sites on the DNA called recombination signal sequences (RSSs). The signal sequences are composed of  a conserved palindromic heptamer and a conserved AT- rich nonamer. These signal sequences are separated by non-conserved spacers of 12 or 23 base pairs called one-turn and two-turn respectively.  They are within the lambda chain, k-chain and the processes of rearrangement in these regions are catalyzed by two recombination-activating genes: RAG-1 and RAG-2 and other enzymes and proteins. The segments joined due to signals generated RSSs that flank each V, D, and J segments. Only genes flank by 12 -bp that join to the genes flank by 23-bp spacer during the rearrangements and combinations to maintain VL-JL and VH-DH-JH joining.

Generation of antibody diversity 

Antibody diversity is produced by genetic rearrangement after shuffling and rejoining one of each of the various gene segments for the heavy and light chains. Due to mixing and random recombination of the gene segments errors can occur at the sites where gene segments join with each other. These errors are one of the sources of the antibody diversity that is commonly observed in both the light and heavy chains. Moreover, when B cells continue to proliferate, mutations accumulate at the variable regions through a process called somatic hypermutation. The high concentrations of these mutations at the variable region also produce high antibody diversity.

Class-switching 

When the B cells get activated, class switching can occur. The class switching involves switch regions that made up of multiple copies of short repeats (GAGCT and TGGGG). These switches occur at the level of rearrangements of the DNA because there is a looping event that chops off the constant regions for IgM and IgD and form the IgG mRNAs. Any continuous looping occurrence will produce IgE or IgA mRNAs. In addition, cytokines are factors that have great effects on class switching of different classes of antibodies.  Their interaction with B cells provides the appropriates signals needed for B cells differentiation and eventual class switching occurrence. For example, interleukin-4 induces the rearrangements of heavy chain immunoglobulin genes. That is IL- 4 induces the switching of Cμ to Cγ to Cκ

References 

Barbara, AO., Richard, AG., and Thomas, JK(2007) Kuby Immunology. W..H Freeman and Company, pp 111–142

Notes

Antibodies
Gene expression